Spanish animation refers to animation made in Spain.

Short films

Silent era
Segundo de Chomón is considered the pioneer of Spanish animation, with the stop-motion shorts he made in France for Pathé starting with La maison hantée (1907). 

An animated sequence within family footage on the First Communion of a child called Mercedes Cura is thought to be the first piece of animation  made in Spain. For a long time El toro fenómeno (Fernando Marco, 1917), which was lost, was considered the first Spanish animated production, but nowadays El apache de Londres, also lost, is thought to date from 1915, and thus the centenary of Spanish animation was held in 2015.

They were immediately followed by other shorts, including political satires. Starting in 1917 with La apertura de las Cortes: Dato no entiende de indirectas animated sketches were included in newsreels, and that same year Joaquín Xaudaró, the best known Spanish animator from the interwar period, made his first film, Las aventuras de Jim Trot, and in 1920 he created the first Spanish sci-fi-themed animated film, La fórmula del Doctor Nap.

In 1932 Xaudaró founded SEDA, the first animation production company in the country, and the directed its first film, Un drama en la costa, which turned out to be his last film as he died in 1933. The company outlived him briefly, producing three more films: El rata primero, Francisca, la mujer fatal and Serenata. En los pasillos del Congreso, a satire of the Second Republic's politics, was left unfinished. By then other cartoonists were experimenting with animation on their own, like José Escobar with La rateta que escrombrara l'escaleta.

Stop-motion was introduced in Spanish animation by Salvador Gijón in 1935, with Sortilegio vacuno and Españolada. It seemed to catch on, and three films (El intrépido Raúl, Pipo y Pipa en busca de Cocolín and Arte, amor y estacazos) were created by different teams in the following year's first months, but the Civil War's outbreak put a halt to all animated productions.

Feature films

Classic era
Spain's first animated feature, Garbancito of La Mancha (1945), was the first European cel-animated and non-American color one, using Dufaycolor. It was a fairy tale where an orphan child loosely based in Don Quixote has to save his friends from a giant with the help of his fairy godmother and goat. Its production company, Balet y Blay, made two more features: Happy Vacations (1948) and The Dreams of Tay-Pi (1952).

Through the 1950 new companies were created. Estudios Moro and Estudios Vara produced the main features in subsequent stages of the Francoist era: The Wizard of Dreams (1966) and The Wardrobe of Time (1971). Cruz Delgado, a Moro animator, created his own studio and directed Magical Adventure (1973), while Manuel García Ferré, who had moved to Argentina, created there features such as The Adventures of Hijitus (1973) and Trapito (1975).

At the later stages of this period underground animation took shape, including the first abstract direct cameraless feature ever, José Antonio Sistiaga's Ere erera baleibu icik subua aruaren (1970), and during the transition to democracy the first Spanish feature restricted for adults was released: Stories of Love and Massacre (1979).

Modern era
In the 1980s the feature production was diversified under the new autonomous system and films based in the local traditions were produced, such as The Magic Pumpkin (Juan Bautista Berasategi, 1985) in Euskadi and Despertaferro (Jordi Amorós, 1990) in Catalonia. "Katy The Caterpillar" (1984) was a coproduction with Mexico and The Town Musicians of Bremen (Cruz Delgado, 1988), spun a popular series, Los Trotamúsicos (1989), was the first animation film prized at the Goya Awards.

Feature production didn't make an impact for most of the 1990s, and only one Goya award was granted in the first half of the decade, for The Return of the North Wind (Maite Ruiz de Austri, 1993). It was however a period of experimentation: Megasónicos (1997) was the first European CGI animation feature, and A Child's Play (Pablo Lloréns, 1999) was the first Spanish stop-motion feature.

Production rose in the following years, and in 2000 four films competed for the Goya Award for the first time. The Living Forest (2001) was the first widely distributed CGI feature, but most films were made in traditional animation for the first half of the decade. While most of them were influenced by American animation, Gisaku (Baltasar Pedrosa, 2005) was branded as the first Spanish anime feature and released at nearly the same time in Japan and Spain.

Contemporary era
From the second half of the 2000s CGI has been the dominating trend in family features. Many of them were co-productions with other countries, such as Great Britain in Kandor Graphics' The Missing Lynx (2008) and Justin and the Knights of Valour (2013). The most ambitious of these co-productions was Planet 51 (2009), with a $70 million budget. At the same time, Spanish animation co-produced foreign films such as Michel Ocelot's Azur and Asmar (2006).

Some of the most ambitious projects in more recent years were produced just in Spain with the backing of television networks, such as Mediaset in Lightbox Entertainment's Tad, the Lost Explorer (2012) and Capture the Flag (2015). Meanwhile live-action directors Juan José Campanella and Javier Fesser entered the CGI animation field with Underdogs (2013) and Mortadelo and Filemon: Mission Implausible (2014) respectively.

Traditional animation is still used in adult projects. Chico and Rita (Fernando Trueba, 2010) won the European Award and was nominated for the Academy Award, while Wrinkles (Ignacio Ferreras, 2011) was nominated for the European Award and the Annie Award. Lastly, stop-motion has been used for horror features such as Going Nuts (Juanjo Ramírez, 2007) and O Apóstolo (Fernando Cortizo, 2012).

List of productions

|-style=font-size:85%
| colspan=10| || bgcolor=lightgreen|Prized || bgcolor=lightblue|Nomin.
|-style=font-size:85%
! rowspan=2|Title !! rowspan=2|Release !! rowspan=2|R. time !! rowspan=2|Technique !! rowspan=2|Main animation studio !! rowspan=2|Director !! rowspan=2|Co-producers !! rowspan=2|Rating !! rowspan=2|Budget !! rowspan=2|Box office !! colspan=4|Awards
|-style=font-size:85%
! Goya !! Euro !! Oscar !! Annie 
|-style=font-size:85%
| Garbancito of La Mancha || 1945-11-23 || 98 min. || Traditional ||  Balet y Blay || J.M. Blay, A. Moreno || colspan=2| || P3.1 million || P3 million
|- bgcolor=lightgrey
| colspan=14|
|-style=font-size:85%
| Happy Holidays || 1948-12-27 || 73 min. || Traditional ||  Balet y Blay || J.M. Blay, A. Moreno || colspan=2| || P3 million || P1.3 million
|- bgcolor=lightgrey
| colspan=14|
|-style=font-size:85%
| Once Upon a Time... || 1950 || 75 min. || Traditional ||  Estela || Alexandre Cirici || colspan=2| || P4 million
|- bgcolor=lightgrey
| colspan=14|
|-style=font-size:85%
| The Dreams of Tay-Pi || 1952-12-22 || || Traditional ||  Balet y Blay || J.M. Blay, F. Winterstein
|- bgcolor=lightgrey
| colspan=14|
|-style=font-size:85%
| The Wizard of Dreams || 1966-12-16 || 70 min. || Traditional ||  Moro || Fernando Macián  
|- bgcolor=lightgrey
| colspan=14|
|-style=font-size:85%
| Mortadelo y Filemon Festival || 1969 || 80 min. || Traditional ||  Vara || Rafael Vara || colspan=3| || P2.2 million
|- bgcolor=lightgrey
| colspan=14|
|-style=font-size:85%
| Mortadelo y Filemon Second Festival || 1970 || 85 min. || Traditional ||  Vara || Rafael Vara || colspan=3| || P2.5 million
|-style=font-size:85%
| Ere erera baleibu icik subua aruaren || 1970 || 75 min. || Drawn-on-film || || José Antonio Sistiaga || colspan=4|
|- bgcolor=lightgrey
| colspan=14|
|-style=font-size:85%
| The Wardrobe of Time || 1971 || 78 min. || Traditional ||  Vara || Rafael Vara || colspan=3| || P40 million
|- bgcolor=lightgrey
| colspan=14|
|-style=font-size:85%
| Magical Adventure || 1973-09-06 || 69 min. || Traditional ||  Cruz Delgado || Cruz Delgado
|-bgcolor=lightgrey
| colspan=14|
|-style=font-size:85%
| The Attic of Fantasy || 1978 || 75 min. || Traditional ||  Cruz Delgado || Cruz Delgado
|- bgcolor=lightgrey
| colspan=14|
|-style=font-size:85%
| Stories of Love and Massacre || 1979-04-16 || 88 min. || Traditional ||  Equip || Jordi Amorós
|- bgcolor=lightgrey
| colspan=14|
|-style=font-size:85%
| Gulliver's Travels || 1983-12-17 || 82 min. || Traditional ||  Cruz Delgado || Cruz Delgado || colspan=2| || P100 million 
|- bgcolor=lightgrey
| colspan=14|
|-style=font-size:85%
| Katy the Caterpillar || 1985-07-15 || 69 min. || Traditional ||  Moro || J.L. Moro, S. Moro ||  || || P80 million
|-style=font-size:85%
| The Little Vagabond || 1985-07-29 || 96 min. || Traditional || || Manuel Rodjara
|-style=font-size:85%
| The Magic Pumpkin || 1985 || 90 min. || Traditional || || Juanba Berasategi
|-bgcolor=lightgrey
| colspan=14|
|-style=font-size:85%
| Town Musicians of Bremen || 1989-06-26 || 86 min. || Traditional ||  Cruz Delgado || Cruz Delgado || colspan=3| || P20 million || bgcolor=lightgreen|
|-bgcolor=lightgrey
| colspan=14|
|-style=font-size:85%
| Peraustrinia 2004 || 1990-04-06 || 75 min. || Traditional ||  Marimón || Ángel García
|-style=font-size:85%
| Despertaferro || 1990-12-05 || 75 min. || Traditional ||  Equip || Jordi Amorós || 
|-bgcolor=lightgrey
| colspan=14|
|-style=font-size:85%
| The Legend of the North Wind || 1992 || 69 min. || Traditional ||  Eskuz || J. Berasategi, M. Ruiz de Austri, C. Varela || colspan=2| || P150 million
|-bgcolor=lightgrey
| colspan=14|
|-style=font-size:85%
| The Return of the North Wind || 1993 || 72 min. || Traditional ||  Eskuz || Maite Ruiz de Austri || colspan=4| || bgcolor=lightgreen|
|-bgcolor=lightgrey
| colspan=14|
|-style=font-size:85%
| Megasónicos || 1997-12-19 || 85 min. || CG animation ||  Baleuko || J. González, J. Martínez || colspan=4| || bgcolor=lightgreen|
|-bgcolor=lightgrey
| colspan=14|
|-style=font-size:85%
| Ahmed, the Prince of Alhambra || 1998-06 || 68 min. || Traditional ||  Lotura || Juanba Berasategi || colspan=4| || bgcolor=lightblue|
|-style=font-size:85%
| ¡Qué vecinos tan animales! || 1998-09-04 || 69 min. || Traditional ||  Extra || Maite Ruiz de Austri || colspan=4| || bgcolor=lightgreen|
|-bgcolor=lightgrey
| colspan=14|
|-style=font-size:85%
| Goomer || 1999-07-09 || 75 min. || Traditional ||  Merlín || J.L. Feito, C. Varela || colspan=4| || bgcolor=lightgreen|
|-style=font-size:85%
| A Children's Game || 1999-10 || 74 min. || Stop-motion ||  Potens || Pablo Llorens || colspan=2| || P48 million
|-style=font-size:85%
| The Thief of Dreams || 1999-12-15 || 70 min. || CG animation ||  Dibulitoon || Ángel Alonso || colspan=2| || P130 million || || bgcolor=lightblue| 
|-bgcolor=lightgrey
| colspan=14|
|-style=font-size:85%
| The Island of the Crab || 2000-10-02 || 68 min. || Traditional ||  Irusoin || T. Basterretxea, J. Muñoz || colspan=2| || P130 million || || bgcolor=lightgreen| 
|-style=font-size:85%
| Marco Antonio: Hong Kong Rescue || 2000-12-01 || 78 min. || Traditional ||  Merlín || M.J. García, C. Varela || colspan=4| || bgcolor=lightblue|
|-bgcolor=lightgrey
| colspan=14|
|-style=font-size:85%
| The Living Forest || 2001-08-03 || 82 min. || CG animation ||  Dygra || Á. de a Cruz, M. Gómez || colspan=2| || €3 million || €2 million || bgcolor=lightgreen|
|-style=font-size:85%
| 10 + 2: The Great Secret || 2001-08-17 || 85 min. || Traditional ||  Acció || Miquel Pujol || colspan=4| || bgcolor=lightblue|
|-style=font-size:85%
| A Dog Called Pain || 2001-11-16 || 90 min. || Traditional || || Luis Eduardo Aute || colspan=4| || bgcolor=lightblue|
|-style=font-size:85%
| The Legend of the Unicorn || 2001-12-21 || 70 min. || Traditional ||  Extra || Maite Ruiz de Austri || colspan=2| || P200 million || || bgcolor=lightblue|
|-bgcolor=lightgrey
| colspan=14|
|-style=font-size:85%
| The King of the Farm || 2002-06-21 || 95 min. || Trad. / CG / live-action ||  Bainet || G. Muro, C. Zabala || colspan=4| || bgcolor=lightblue|
|-style=font-size:85%
| The Warriors of the Apocalypse || 2002-08-14 || 80 min. || CG animation ||  Ovidio DVD || Jesús M. Montané
|-style=font-size:85%
| Time Gate || 2002-11-29 || 80 min. || Traditional ||  Animatoons || Pedro E. Delgado || colspan=4| || bgcolor=lightblue|
|-style=font-size:85%
| Dragon Hill || 2002-12-20 || 80 min. || Traditional ||  Milímetros || Ángel Izquierdo || colspan=2| || €3 million || || bgcolor=lightgreen|
|-style=font-size:85%
| Anjé, the Pyrenaic Legend || 2002 || 67 min. || CG animation ||  Baleuko || Juanjo Elordi || colspan=4| || bgcolor=lightblue|
|-bgcolor=lightgrey
| colspan=14| 
|-style=font-size:85%
| El embrujo del Sur || 2003-07-04 || 89 min. || Traditional ||  Lotura || Juanba Berasategi || colspan=2| || €1.2 million || || bgcolor=lightblue|
|-style=font-size:85%
| Betizu Among the Stars || 2003-10-31 || 71 min. || CG animation ||  Baleuko || Egoitz Rodríguez 
|-style=font-size:85%
| El Cid: The Legend || 2003-12-19 || 90 min. || Traditional ||  Filmax || Raúl del Pozo || colspan=2| || €8 million || €2.6 million || bgcolor=lightgreen|
|-style=font-size:85%
| The Three Wise Men || 2003-12-19 || 76 min. || Traditional ||  Animagic || Antonio Navarro || colspan=2| || €7.2 million || €2.3 million || bgcolor=lightblue|
|-bgcolor=lightgrey
| colspan=14|
|-style=font-size:85%
| Pinocchio 3000 || 2004-02-09 || 79 min. || CG animation ||  CinéGroupe || Daniel Robichaud ||   || || $12 million || $15 million || bgcolor=lightgreen|
|-style=font-size:85%
| The Balunis in the Adventure in the End of the World || 2004-03-19 || 88 min. || CG animation ||  Baleuko || Juanjo Elordi || colspan=4| || bgcolor=lightblue|
|-style=font-size:85%
| Glup, una aventura sin desperdicio || 2004-04-02 || 73 min. || Traditional ||  Dibulitoon || A. Arregi, I. Berasategui || colspan=2| || €1.2 million || || bgcolor=lightblue|
|-style=font-size:85%
| Supertramps || 2004-12-01 || 79 min. || CG animation ||  Dibulitoon || Íñigo Berasategi, Jose Mari Goenaga || colspan=2| || €1.2 million || || bgcolor=lightblue|
|-bgcolor=lightgrey
| colspan=14|
|-style=font-size:85%
| Arensivia's Death || 2005 || 85 min. || Traditional ||  El Jueves || Maikel García 
|-style=font-size:85%
| Gisaku || 2005-03-04 || 81 min. || Traditional ||  Filmax || Baltasar Pedrosa || colspan=2| || €4 million || €133,000 
|-style=font-size:85%
| The Monstruous Adventures of Zipi and Zape || 2005-03-09 || 80 min. || Traditional ||  BRB || Claudio Biern Boyd
|-style=font-size:85%
| Midsummer Dream || 2005-07-01 || 98 min. || CG animation ||  Dygra || Ángel de la Cruz, Manolo Gómez ||  || || €6 million || €1.5 million || bgcolor=lightgreen| 
|-style=font-size:85%
| Olentzero and the Magic Trunk || 2005-12-23 || 82 min. || CG animation ||  Baleuko || Juanjo Elordi || colspan=2| || €1.3 million
|-bgcolor=lightgrey
| colspan=14|
|-style=font-size:85%
| The Warrior Without a Name || 2006-04-07 || 90 min. || CG animation ||  Tornasol || David Iglesias || colspan=2| || €2.3 million 
|-style=font-size:85%
| PayaS.O.S. ¡¡¡al rescate!!! || 2006-12-29 || 70 min. || Traditional ||  Lotura || Imanol Zinkunegi 
|-bgcolor=lightgrey
| colspan=14|
|-style=font-size:85%
| De Profundis || 2007-01-19 || 75 min. || Traditional ||  || Miguelanxo Prado || colspan=2| || €1.5 million 
|-bgcolor=lightgrey
| colspan=14|
|-style=font-size:85%
| Klaus || 2018 ||  || Traditional ||  ||  || colspan=2| ||

Television animation

Classic era
Animation first appeared at the Spanish television in commercials and spots. The most famous one was José Luis Moro's The Telerín Family (1964), which was used to tell children it was time to go to bed. Its characters went on to star in the 1966 The Wizard of Dreams feature.

In 1968 former Estudios Moro animator Cruz Delgado created for TVE the first Spanish animated series, Microbio. One year before émigré animator Manuel García Ferré had created in Argentina the Hijitus series.

Modern era
Cruz Delgado's Don Quixote of La Mancha (1979–81) was the first large success in Spanish TV animation, which boosted in the following years. Co-productions were set, with Nippon Animation creating the animation for BRB Internacional's Ruy, the Little Cid (1979), Dogtanian and the Three Muskehounds (1981) and Around the World with Willy Fog (1984), while The World of David the Gnome (1985) was an international success.

References

External links

Spanish animation